Adolf Hütter (born 11 February 1970) is an Austrian professional football coach and former player who was most recently the head coach of Borussia Mönchengladbach. As a player, Hütter reached the 1993–94 UEFA Cup final, won the Austrian championship three times with Austria Salzburg and won the Austrian Cup with Grazer AK. As a coach, he won the Austrian double, again in Salzburg colors, as well as the Swiss championship, with Young Boys. He then managed Eintracht Frankfurt from 2018 to 2021. He left Frankfurt to become coach of Borussia Mönchengladbach for the 2021–22 season where he in turn parted company with the club after one year in charge.

Playing career
Hütter played for Altach in his youth before moving to Grazer AK and Austria Salzburg. There, he was a three-time Austrian champion and won the Supercup. With Salzburg, he reached the UEFA-Cup final in 1994 where Salzburg lost two times 0–1 against Inter Milan. Hütter played for the Austria national football team 14 times and scored 3 goals.

In 2000, Hütter joined Grazer AK again. After two years, he joined first division team Kapfenberg. In 2005, Hütter joined the amateur team of Red Bull Salzburg Juniors and secured promotion to the Austrian first division. After achilles problems, he joined the coaching staff as assistant of Gerald Baumgartner in August 2007.

Coaching career

Salzburg Juniors, Altach, Grödig, Salzburg

Hütter is the former assistant coach and head coach of Red Bull Salzburg Juniors. He finished with a record of 13 wins, seven draws, and 15 losses at the club. He was head coach of Rheindorf Altach between 1 July 2009 and 5 April 2012. In the 2009–10 season, Rheindorf Altach lost to FC Pasching in the first round of the Austrian Cup and finished third in the league. In the 2010–11 season, Rheindorf Altach got to the Round of 16 of the Austrian Cup and finished second in the league. In the 2011–12 season, Rheindorf Altach were eliminated from the Austrian Cup in the first round. He started managing SV Grödig on 1 July 2012. In the 2012–13 season, Grödig were eliminated in the second round of the Austrian Cup. In the 2013–14 season, Grödig were eliminated in the first round of the Austrian Cup. He had led Grödig to a 2014–15 UEFA Europa League spot after 3–3 draw on the final matchday against Wacker Innsbruck. He took over Red Bull Salzburg for the 2014–15 season His first training session was on 16 June 2014. His first match was a 10–1 win against 1. SC Sollenau on 12 July 2014. He resigned on 15 June 2015. He won the double in his only season. His final match was a 2–0 win in the Austrian Cup final on 3 June 2015.

Young Boys Bern

In September 2015, Hütter took over as head coach of Swiss Super League side BSC Young Boys. In April 2018, Hütter's Young Boys won the Swiss Super League for the first time since 1986.

Eintracht Frankfurt
On 16 May 2018, Hütter was confirmed to be Eintracht Frankfurt's next head coach, succeeding Niko Kovač. He started as coach on 1 July 2018. On 12 August 2018, he lost his first competitive match (German Super Cup) 5–0 to Bayern Munich. Then on 18 August 2018, Eintracht Frankfurt were knocked out in the first round of the German Cup by fourth division SSV Ulm. After a poor start of the 2018–19 Bundesliga season (just four points in five matchdays), Eintracht did not lose in the next 11 games, winning 10, in the Bundesliga and Europa League. Frankfurt had a similar winning streak in the second half of the season, and reached the semi-final of the Europa League where they drew twice and lost on penalties against Chelsea. At the end of the season, Hütter was voted by readers of German newspaper Bild as Coach of the Year while Eintracht Frankfurt was voted as the Team of the Year. The union of professional football players also voted Hütter as Coach of the Year.

On 13 April, Hütter announced that he would leave Frankfurt and join Borussia Mönchengladbach for the 2021–22 season.

Borussia Mönchengladbach
After a disappointing 10th place finish in the Bundesliga, two positions lower than in the previous campaign under Marco Rose, Hütter announced he was to leave Mönchengladbach after the season’s conclusion by mutual consent with the club’s hierarchy on 14 May 2022. Hütter was succeeded by Daniel Farke.

Coaching record

Honours

Coach
Red Bull Salzburg
Austrian Football Bundesliga: 2014–15
Austrian Cup: 2014–15

Young Boys
Swiss Super League: 2017–18

 Individual
 VDV Coach of the Season: 2018–19, 2020–21

References

External links

1970 births
Living people
Association football midfielders
Austrian footballers
Austria international footballers
SC Rheindorf Altach players
Grazer AK players
FC Red Bull Salzburg players
Kapfenberger SV players
Austrian football managers
FC Red Bull Salzburg managers
BSC Young Boys managers
Eintracht Frankfurt managers
Borussia Mönchengladbach managers
Austrian expatriate football managers
Austrian expatriate sportspeople in Germany
Austrian expatriate sportspeople in Switzerland
Austrian Football Bundesliga players
Expatriate football managers in Germany
Expatriate football managers in Switzerland
People from Hohenems
Footballers from Vorarlberg